Crocus biflorus, the silvery crocus or scotch crocus, is a species of flowering plant in the genus Crocus of the family Iridaceae, native to southeastern Europe and southwestern Asia, including Italy, the Balkans, Ukraine, Turkey, Caucasus, Iraq, and Iran. It is a highly variable species, with flowers in shades of pale mauve or white, often with darker stripes on the outer tepals. The flowers appear early in spring.

Description
Crocus biflorus is a herbaceous perennial geophyte growing from a corm. The corm is globe-shaped with flattened ends, covered with a smooth tunic that has two or three rings. The white-lilac flowers with yellow throats have purple-blue striped outer surfaces. Each blooming corm typical produces two flowers, thus the species epithet "biflorus".

Classification
According to the taxonomic classification proposed by Brian Mathew in 1982, C. biflorus falls within the series Biflori of the section Nudiscapus within the genus Crocus. However, modern DNA analysis is challenging whether the series Biflori can be separated from the Reticulati and Speciosi series. At least 21 subspecies of C. biflorus have been named; furthermore numerous cultivars have been raised for garden use.

Subspecies
Crocus biflorus subsp. adamii (J.Gay) K.Richt. - Balkans, Ukraine, Crimea, Caucasus, Iran
Crocus biflorus subsp. albocoronatus Kerndorff - Taurus Mountains in Turkey
Crocus biflorus subsp. artvinensis (J.Philippow) B.Mathew - Caucasus, northeastern Turkey
Crocus biflorus subsp. atrospermus Kernd. & Pasche - Turkey
Crocus biflorus subsp. biflorus - Italy including Sicily, Turkey, Rodhos (Ρόδος, Rhodes) Island in Greece
Crocus biflorus subsp. caelestis Kernd. & Pasche - Turkey
Crocus biflorus subsp. caricus Kernd. & Pasche - Turkey
Crocus biflorus subsp. crewei (Hook.f.) B.Mathew - Turkey, Greek islands
Crocus biflorus subsp. fibroannulatus Kernd. & Pasche - Artvin Province in Turkey
Crocus biflorus subsp. ionopharynx Kernd. & Pasche - Turkey
Crocus biflorus subsp. isauricus (Siehe ex Bowles) B.Mathew - Turkey
Crocus biflorus subsp. leucostylosus Kernd. & Pasche - Denizli Province in Turkey
Crocus biflorus subsp. nubigena (Herb.) B.Mathew - Turkey, Greek islands. Found growing in evergreen oak scrub and pine forests from 100 to 1000 meters; blooming in November to March. 
Crocus biflorus subsp. pseudonubigena B.Mathew - Turkey
Crocus biflorus subsp. pulchricolor (Herb.) B.Mathew - Turkey
Crocus biflorus subsp. punctatus B.Mathew - Turkey
Crocus biflorus subsp. stridii (Papan. & Zacharof) B.Mathew - northeastern Greece
Crocus biflorus subsp. tauri (Maw) B.Mathew - Caucasus, Turkey, Iran, Iraq. Found growing in damp woods, on open hillside with dry soils, and in alpine turf up to 3000 meters in elevation. Flowering from January to May. 
Crocus biflorus subsp. weldenii (Hoppe & Fürnr.) K.Richt - Italy, Albania, Yugoslavia. Found growing around 1000 meters in rocky woods, commonly on limestone. 
Crocus biflorus subsp. yataganensis Kernd. & Pasche - Turkey

Award
The cultivar 'Blue Pearl' has gained the Royal Horticultural Society's Award of Garden Merit.

References

biflorus
Flora of Europe
Flora of Asia
Garden plants
Plants described in 1768
Taxa named by Philip Miller